In the traditional Chilote mythology of Chiloé, Chile, the Trauco is a humanoid creature of small stature—similar to a dwarf or goblin—who lives deep in the forest. It has an ugly face, and legs without feet.

Legend
The Trauco is a mythical entity that inhabits the woods of Chiloé, an island in the south of Chile. It is a child of the snake god Coi Coi-Vilu. It has a powerful magnetism that attracts young and middle-aged women. According to myth, the Trauco's wife is the wicked and ugly Fiura. The Trauco carries a small stone-headed hatchet that he uses to strike trees in the forest to symbolize his sexual potency.

Upon being chosen by him, any woman—even if she's asleep—will go to the Trauco; bewitched and helpless against his sexual allure, she falls at his feet and proceeds to engage in sexual intercourse with him. Some men of Chiloé fear the Trauco, as they believe his gaze can be deadly.

When a single woman is pregnant and no one steps forward as the father, people assume that the Trauco is the father. Because the creature is irresistible, the woman is considered blameless. The Trauco is sometimes invoked to explain sudden or unwanted pregnancies, especially in unmarried women.

Edith Rebolledo Muller, MSc in Sociology, states the following: "In fact, teen pregnancy has its explanation in this myth, as a way to justify this shame. Then it will be cleansed by marriage, as an institution that allows regulating and holding bodies into submission".

Media
The Trauco appears in The Luke Coles Book Series by Josh Walker, where he functions as an antagonist in some of the subplots.

See also
 Pombero
 Incubus
 Lists of humanoids
 Chilean mythology
 Little people (mythology)

References

Further reading
 John E. Roth. American elves: an encyclopedia of little people from the lore of 380 ethnic groups of the Western Hemisphere. McFarland, 1997. , .
 Edith Rebolledo Muller, Género y ruralidad. Testimonios de vida de mujeres rurales de Chiloé, Multidisciplinary Journal on Gender Studies, 2012,

External links

Chilote mythology
Mapuche mythology
Chilote legendary creatures
Mythic humanoids
Mythological characters
Goblins